; stylised as cielo) is an Italian free-to-air television channel owned by Sky Italia aimed towards young audiences, and is available on digital terrestrial television and on Sky satellite television platform. Originally planned to be launched on 1 December 2009, it was delayed to 16 December 2009. While the concept is very similar to Sky UK's counterpart Pick (where it shows reruns of programs already shown on Sky's UK channels), it also simulcasts Sky TG24 for news bulletins.

Sky Italia has broadcast the coverage of the XXII Olympic Winter Games in Sochi (in which Sky owned broadcasting rights for Italy) free-to-air on the channel.

References

External links
 
 

Italian-language television stations
Sky Italia
Television channels and stations established in 2009
Television channels in Italy